Osiecki (feminine: Osiecka; plural: Osieccy) is a Polish surname derived from the village Osieck, Mazovia, Poland. Notable people include:
 Agnieszka Osiecka (1936–1997), Polish writer
 Mark Osiecki (born 1968), American ice hockey player and coach
 Piotr Osiecki (born 1961), Polish politician
 Sandy Osiecki (born 1960), American football player
 Stanisław Osiecki (1875–1967), Polish politician
 Stefan Osiecki (1902–1977), Polish painter

See also
 Ossietzky
 

Polish-language surnames